Attheyella longipes is a species of crustacean in the family Canthocamptidae. It is endemic to Australia.

References

Harpacticoida
Freshwater crustaceans of Australia
Vulnerable fauna of Australia
Taxonomy articles created by Polbot
Crustaceans described in 1987